Ali Hijazi (born November 23, 1976) is a former Sierra Leonean international basketball player and the current manager of the Sierra Leone national basketball team. He has been the coach of the national basketball team since 2004. Hijazi was born in Freetown, the capital city of Sierra Leone to parents of Lebanese descent. He is a father of three girls ; Rayan , Maya and Alina .

Hijazi is also a business man and the current exclusive agent of Phillip Morris. He is also known for being a great humanitarian by helping the war stricken people of Sierra Leone.

External links
 http://awoko.org/index.php?mact=News,cntnt01,print,0&cntnt01articleid=2026&cntnt01showtemplate=false&cntnt01returnid=304
 

Living people
Sportspeople from Freetown
Sierra Leonean men's basketball players
1976 births
Sierra Leonean people of Lebanese descent
Sportspeople of Lebanese descent